Metzler is a surname

Metzler may refer to:
22583 Metzler, a Main-belt Asteroid
Metzler Bank, a private banking company in Germany
Metzler Orgelbau, a firm of organ builders based in Switzerland
J. B. Metzler, a subsidiary of Springer Nature publishing group

See also